Aalorungi Arangorungi is a 1986 Indian Malayalam film, directed by Thevalakkara Chellappan. The film stars Mammootty, Shobhana, Menaka and Thilakan in the lead roles. The film has musical score by Jerry Amaldev.

Plot
The film is about a police inspector who tries to live humanely as possible, and the associated events in his life.

Cast

Mammootty as Rajan
Shobhana as Geetha
Menaka as Marykutty
Bhagyalakshmi as Radha
Thilakan as Prabhakara Menon
Pattom Sadan as Vareechan
Sathaar as Kaduva Thommachan
Kaduvakulam Antony as P. C. Kunjappan
Kuyili as Nisha
Lalithasree as Soshamma Cherian
Lalu Alex as Thampi
Mala Aravindan as Mathunni, Chakkunni (double role)
Meena as Padmavathi
P. K. Abraham as Doctor
Mukesh as Vinod
Kollam Ajith as Gunda

Soundtrack
The music was composed by Jerry Amaldev and the lyrics were written by Poovachal Khader.

References

External links

1986 films
1980s Malayalam-language films
Films directed by Thevalakkara Chellappan
Films scored by Jerry Amaldev